Variety Jubilee is a 1943 British historical musical film directed by Maclean Rogers and starring Reginald Purdell, Ellis Irving and Lesley Brook. It depicts life in a London music hall from 1892 to the Second World War. It was made at the Riverside Studios in Hammersmith. The film was re-released in 1945, to capitalise on the popularity of Ealing's Champagne Charlie.

Plot
Variety Jubilee is a melodrama chronicling three generations of a family of music hall owners. At the start of the 20th century, two former variety artists, Joe and Kit, become partners in running a music hall. The First World War brings the death of Kit's son, and the end of the war a decline in popularity of music halls. Joe and Kit's business falls into disrepair, and finally, Kit and his wife die in poverty. Eventually, Kit's grandson successfully resurrects the family music hall, before joining the RAF to fight in the second World War.

Cast

Critical reception
Radio Times gave the film three out of five stars, noting a "simple, nostalgic tribute to the British music hall...The film consists largely of musical variety acts performed by numerous forgotten old-timers of a bygone era, with Marie Lloyd Jr impersonating her famous mother. Comedian George Robey, a team of cancan dancers and the band of the Coldstream Guards are also among the arcane and rather touching attractions."

References

Bibliography
 Harper, Sue. Picturing the Past: The Rise and Fall of the British Costume Film. British Film Institute, 1994.
 Murphy, Robert. Realism and Tinsel: Cinema and Society in Britain 1939-48. Routledge, 1992.

External links

1943 films
1940s historical musical films
British historical musical films
Films directed by Maclean Rogers
Films set in London
Films set in the 1890s
Films set in the 1900s
Films set in the 1910s
Films set in the 1920s
Films set in the 1930s
Films shot at Riverside Studios
British black-and-white films
Films scored by Percival Mackey
1940s English-language films
1940s British films